Portal of Sorrow is the eighth studio album by American black metal act Xasthur. It would be Xasthur's last album of the black metal genre, as the next album Subject to Change features a more acoustic folk sound.

Track listing

Personnel
Malefic – All instruments, vocals
Marissa Nadler - Vocals
Ronald Armand Andruchuk - Album artwork and layout

2010 albums
Xasthur albums
Hydra Head Records albums